Ajagaibi is a village development committee in Rautahat District in Province No. 2 of south-eastern Nepal. At the time of the 1991 Nepal census it had a population of 2923 people.

References

Populated places in Rautahat District